Minuscule 432 (in the Gregory-Aland numbering), α 501 (in the Soden numbering), is a Greek minuscule manuscript of the New Testament, on paper. Palaeographically it has been assigned to the 14th century. Formerly it was labelled by 72e, 79p, and 37r.

Description 

The codex contains the text of the New Testament except the Gospels on 218 paper leaves. It is written in one column per page, in 24 lines per page. It contains Prolegomena.

The order of books: Acts, Catholic epistles, Pauline epistles (Philemon, Hebrews), and Apocalypse.

Text 

The Greek text of the codex is a representative of the Byzantine text-type. Aland placed it in Category V.

History 

Birch dated the manuscript to the 13th century, Gregory to the 15th century. Currently it is dated by the INTF to the 14th century.

Peltanus used this manuscript in 1580 in Ingolstadt. The manuscript was examined by Birch and Delitzsch. The manuscript was added to the list of New Testament manuscripts by Scholz (1794–1852).
C. R. Gregory saw it in 1886.

Formerly it was labelled by 72a, 79p, and 37r. In 1908 Gregory gave the number 432 to it.

It is currently housed at the Vatican Library (Vat. gr. 366) in Rome.

See also 

 List of New Testament minuscules
 Biblical manuscript
 Textual criticism

References

Further reading 

 

Greek New Testament minuscules
14th-century biblical manuscripts
Manuscripts of the Vatican Library